The Roman Catholic Diocese of Quiché is a Latin suffragan diocese in the ecclesiastical province of the Archdiocese of Los Altos Quetzaltenango-Totonicapán.

History 
It was erected 27 April 1967, as the Diocese of Santa Cruz del Quiché, on territory split off from the then Diocese of Sololá.
 
It was renamed on 11 July 2000.

Episcopal ordinaries
(all Roman Rite)
 Suffragan Bishops of Santa Cruz del Quiché 
 Humberto Lara Mejía, Lazarists (C.M.) (1967.05.05 – 1972.06.09), previously Titular Bishop of Trajanopolis in Phrygia (1957.07.19 – 1967.05.05) & Auxiliary Bishop of Vera Paz (Guatemala) (1957.07.19 – 1967.05.05); also President of Episcopal Conference of Guatemala (1970–1972)
? José Julio Aguilar García (1972–1974)
 Juan José Gerardi Conedera (1974.08.22 – 1984.08.14), also President of Episcopal Conference of Guatemala (1970–1972); previously Bishop of Vera Paz (Guatemala) (1967.05.05 – 1974.08.22), President of Episcopal Conference of Guatemala (1972–1978); later Titular Bishop of Guardialfiera (1984.08.14 – 1998.04.26) & Auxiliary Bishop of Guatemala (Guatemala) (1984.08.14 – 1998.04.26)

 Suffragan Bishops of Quiché 
 Julio Edgar Cabrera Ovalle (1986.10.31 – 2001.12.05), later Bishop of Jalapa (Guatemala) (2001.12.05 – ...)
 Mario Alberto Molina Palma, Augustinian Recollects (O.A.R.) (2004.10.29 – 2011.07.14), later Metropolitan Archbishop of Los Altos Quetzaltenango-Totonicapán (Guatemala) (2011.07.14 – ...), vice-president of Episcopal Conference of Guatemala (2012.03 – ...)
 Rosolino Bianchetti Boffelli (2012.09.14 – ...), previously Bishop of Zacapa (Guatemala) (2008.11.20 – 2012.09.14), Bishop-Prelate of Santo Cristo de Esquipulas (Guatemala) (2008.11.20 – 2012.09.14)

References

Source and external links 
 GigaCatholic, with incumbent biography links

Quiche
Quiche
Quiche
Santa Cruz del Quiché
1967 establishments in Guatemala
Roman Catholic Ecclesiastical Province of Los Altos Quetzaltenango-Totonicapán